11 Razones Tour is the second concert tour by Spanish singer Aitana to promote her sophomore album 11 Razones (2020). The tour began on 1 July 2021 in Barcelona and visited bullrings, parks, amphitheatres and indoor arenas. An extension to the tour, 11 Razones + Tour began in September 2022, visiting major concert venues in Spain and Latin America until 20 December 2022.

Background 
Following the release of the second studio album by Aitana, the singer announced the first nineteen dates of the corresponding concert tour on April 13, 2021, with tickets going on sale that same day. More concerts were announced in the upcoming weeks. On March 16, 2022, the singer revealed six dates for a second leg of the tour, 11 Razones + Tour, which is scheduled to begin in September. A second show in Madrid was announced two days after the general sale due to overwhelming demand. In May, Aitana announced three concerts in Mexico and, in July, four more dates in Latin America.

Set list 
This set list is representative of the July 1, 2021 show in Barcelona. It does not represent all concerts for the duration of the tour.

"11 Razones"
"Cuando Te Fuiste"
"Mejor Que Tú"
"Corazón sin Vida"
"Teléfono"
"Si No Vas a Volver"
"÷ (Dividido)"
"Ni Una Más"
"× (Por)"
"= (Igual)"
"Mándame un Audio (Remix)"
"Enemigos"
"Presiento" / "Más de Lo Que Aposté"
"Con la Miel en los Labios"
"- (Menos)"
"Hold" / "Smells Like Teen Spirit" (Nirvana cover)
"Resilient (Remix)"
"Si Tú La Quieres"
"No Te Has Ido y Ya Te Extraño"
"Me Quedo"
"Tu Foto del DNI"
"Vas a Quedarte"
"+ (Más)"

Shows

Cancelled shows

Notes

References 

2021 concert tours
2022 concert tours
Concert tours of Spain